Northern Zonal Council is a zonal council that comprises the states and union territories of Chandigarh, National Capital Territory of Delhi, Haryana, Himachal Pradesh, Jammu and Kashmir, Punjab, Rajasthan and Ladakh.

The States have been grouped into six zones having an Advisory Council to foster cooperation among these States. Five Zonal Councils were set up vide Part-III of the States Reorganisation Act, 1956.

See also 
 North-Eastern Zonal Council
 Central Zonal Council
 Eastern Zonal Council
 Western Zonal Council
 Southern Zonal Council

References

Zonal Councils